Apaiba Leichil (Flurry Clouds) is a 2021 Indian Meitei language film directed by Bobby Wahengbam. It is jointly produced by Wahengbam Tomba, Hanjabam Sobhananda (Bung) Sharma and Bobby Wahengbam under the banner of Third Eye Productions. The film is based on the short story Nungshibagi Saklon (Nungsitombi) by Rajmani Ayekpam. It stars Bishesh Huirem and Arun Yumnam in the lead roles. The film won three awards at the 14th Manipur State Film Awards 2022.

It shows one Nupi Sabi becoming popular in the Shumang Kumhei troupe but whether the popularity of Nupi Sabis is related to their personal romantic life and social outlook is not properly known.

Cast
 Yumnam Arun
 Bishesh Huirem
 Naoba
 Nirmala

Accolades
Bishesh Huirem bagged the Best Actor Award at the 14th Manipur State Film Awards 2022. With this, Huirem becomes the first transgender to win the award.

See also 
 List of Meitei-language films

References

Meitei-language films
2021 films
2021 drama films
Indian drama films
2020s Indian films
Films about trans women
Indian LGBT-related films